Kotehra is a village of Mandi Bahauddin District in the Punjab province of Pakistan. It is located at 32°42'0N 73°31'0E at an altitude of 205 metres (675 feet).

Kotehra is a small village near Malakwal M.B.DIN in Punjab Pakistan. It is a green landed village in the west of Malakwal between River Jehlum and Canal Jehlam Lower. There are about 200 homes and the population is about 2500. Most people are farmers and daily laborers.

References

Villages in Mandi Bahauddin District